Amphitorna submontana is a moth in the family Drepanidae. It was described by Jeremy Daniel Holloway in 1976. It is found on Borneo, where it has been recorded from the lowlands of Brunei, as well as at altitudes of about 1,600 meters on the slopes of Mount Kinabalu.

References

Moths described in 1976
Drepaninae
Moths of Borneo